James Roger Beatty (1917-November 25, 2010) was a B. F. Goodrich Senior Research Fellow.

Education 

Beatty was born in Iola, Kansas.  He obtained a Physics degree from Kansas State University. He served in the U.S. Cavalry, Fort Riley, from which he received an honorable discharge in 1936.

Career 

Beatty moved to Akron, Ohio in 1942 to join B. F. Goodrich.  He remained with the company until his retirement in 1982 as a senior research fellow.  

Beatty was a prolific inventor and author of scientific papers on rubber technology.  His patents included testing devices / methods for measuring cure behavior, ozone cracking, rubber tack and cutting and chipping resistance of rubber.

Awards and recognitions

 1982 - Inaugural recipient of the Melvin Mooney Distinguished Technology Award from the ACS Rubber Division

References 

1917 births
2010 deaths
Polymer scientists and engineers
20th-century American engineers
Kansas State University alumni
People from Iola, Kansas
20th-century American inventors